Fechtner syndrome is a variant of Alport syndrome characterized by leukocyte inclusions, macrothrombocytopenia, thrombocytopenia, nephritis, and sensorineural hearing loss.   Some patients may also develop cataracts.

References

External links 

Syndromes affecting blood
Coagulopathies
Cytoskeletal defects
Kidney diseases
Syndromes affecting hearing
Syndromes affecting the kidneys